WGSG (89.5 FM) is a radio station broadcasting a Christian format. Licensed to Mayo, Florida, United States, the station is currently owned by Jimmy Swaggart Ministries.

References

External links

Radio stations established in 1991
1991 establishments in Florida
Southern Gospel radio stations in the United States
GSG